The Legal and Technical Secretariat of the Presidency of the Argentine Nation (SLyT) is a secretariat of state of the Argentine National Executive counting with ministerial level, tasked with assisting the President of Argentina, the Chief of the Cabinet of Ministers and all other dependencies of the President's Office that may not count with their own legal departments on the drafting of decrees, legislative bills, administrative decisions and legal messages.

The Legal and Technical Secretariat also oversees the Official Bulletin of the Argentine Republic, the national government's gazette. Since 10 December 2019, the Legal and Technical Secretary of the Presidency has been Vilma Ibarra, who serves under President Alberto Fernández.

It is one of (currently) four secretariats in the Argentine government counting with ministerial level, the other being the General Secretariat, the Secretariat of Strategic Affairs and the Secretariat of Communications and Press.

Attributions and organization
The 1983 Law on Ministries, decreed by Raúl Alfonsín, established eight secretariats reporting directly to the Office of the President tasked to delegate some of the President's direct responsibilities whilst aiding the head of state in the elaboration of public policies, among other responsibilities. These included the General Secretariat of the Presidency, the Planning Secretariat, the Intelligence Secretariat (SIDE, later disestablished and reformed into the AFI), the Media Secretariat, the Public Affairs Secretariat, the Science and Technology Secretariat, the Secretariat of Comprehensive Policies on Drugs (SEDRONAR) and the Habitat Secretariat. The Legal and Technical Undersecretariat operated under the scope of the General Secretariat until it was given its current status in February 1986.

Headquarters
The Legal and Technical Secretariat is entirely headquartered in the Casa Rosada, the official working residence of the President of Argentina.

List of secretaries

References

External links
 Official website (in Spanish)

Government agencies of Argentina
Government agencies established in 1983